Nehemie Kankolongo (born April 4, 1992) is a Canadian football linebacker for the Edmonton Eskimos of the Canadian Football League (CFL). He was originally signed as an undrafted free agent by the Saskatchewan Roughriders on May 27, 2015. After one season with the Roughriders, he was released during the 2016 training camp and was subsequently signed by the BC Lions on June 20, 2016. Kankolongo played in 13 games with the Lions, but was released at the team's training camp on June 10, 2017. He played college football with the Wyoming Cowboys.

References

External links
 Winnipeg Blue Bombers bio
 BC Lions bio
 Canadian Football League profile
 

1992 births
Living people
BC Lions players
Canadian football linebackers
Wyoming Cowboys football players
Players of Canadian football from British Columbia
People from Coquitlam
Saskatchewan Roughriders players
Winnipeg Blue Bombers players
Montreal Alouettes players